Engberg is a Scandinavian surname, meaning "meadow (äng) mountain". Notable people with the surname include:

Eric Engberg (1941–2016), former CBS reporter
Lars Engberg (1943–2017), Danish politician
Lotta Engberg (born 1963), Swedish singer
Mary Davenport Engberg (1880–1951), American violinist, composer and conductor
Niels Engberg
Torsten Engberg (1934–2018), Swedish Coastal Artillery lieutenant general

See also 
Engberg Bluff, bold ice-covered bluff in Victoria Land
Engdahl
Englund

Swedish-language surnames